The 2004 NCAA National Collegiate Women's Ice Hockey Tournament involved four schools playing in single-elimination play to determine the national champion of women's NCAA Division I college ice hockey. It began on March 26, 2004, and ended with the championship game on March 28. A total of four games were played.

NCAA Frozen Four

All-Tournament Team
 G, Jody Horak, Minnesota
 D, Angela Ruggiero, Harvard
 D, Allie Sanchez, Minnesota
 F, Krissy Wendell, Minnesota*
 F, Natalie Darwitz, Minnesota
 F, Kelly Stephens, Minnesota

* Most Outstanding Player(s)

References

NCAA Women's Ice Hockey Tournament
Ice hockey in Rhode Island
2004 in sports in Rhode Island